Raja Beni Mellal is a Moroccan football club currently playing in the second division Botola 2. The club was founded in 1956 and is located in the town of Beni Mellal.

History

Raja Beni Mellal was founded in 1956 by Monsieur Abdellatif Mesfioui after the alliance of a set of clubs of the city of Beni Mellal they included the Ittihad Al Mellali et La Mouloudia.

Abdellatif Mesfioui was the first president of the club following the merger between the Ittihad and Mouloudia. The club businesses still have the final of the Champions Cup Maghreb against Club Africain. Best Presidents of the club's history to date were Lhaj Jilali Lasri (1973-1974 and 1974–1975) and his son Lhaj Abdelwahed Lasri (2010-2011 and 2011–2012) where during their activity there have been the best four seasons in the history of Raja Beni Mellal.

Honours

Maghreb Champions Cup
Runner-up: 1975
Moroccan Championship (1)
Champion: 1974

External links
Club logo

References

Football clubs in Morocco
1956 establishments in Morocco
Sports clubs in Morocco
Association football clubs established in 1956
Béni Mellal-Khénifra